Haxey Junction railway station was a station south of the town of Haxey, on the Isle of Axholme in Lincolnshire, England. Both stations are now closed, although the former Great Northern and Great Eastern Joint Railway line is still operational.

It was originally started by the Isle of Axholme Light Railway in 1899, but became part of the Axholme Joint Railway in January 1903, before construction was completed. Passenger services ceased in 1933 but freight continued until closure on 1 February 1956, although the line north of Epworth to Marshland Junction and Goole remained open for freight until 5 April 1965.

References

Bibliography

Disused railway stations in the Borough of North Lincolnshire
Former Axholme Joint Railway stations
Railway stations in Great Britain opened in 1905
Railway stations in Great Britain closed in 1933